Joseph Lawson Edward Howze (born Lawson Edward Howze, August 30, 1923 – January 9, 2019) was an African-American prelate of the Catholic Church. He served as the first Bishop of Biloxi from 1977 to 2001, and was the first openly Black Catholic bishop of a US diocese.

Early life
Howze was born in Daphne, Alabama. He was the oldest of four children born to Albert Otis Howze Sr. and Helen Lawson Howze. His mother died when he was five. He had six siblings in total. He grew up with neighbors who were Catholic and attributed his Catholicism to that influence.  He attended kindergarten at Most Pure Heart of Mary School in Mobile. He was later transferred to the segregated public schools of Mobile, graduating from Mobile County Secondary School in 1944. Howze originally aspired to become a doctor and studied chemistry, biology, and physics. He graduated from Alabama State Branch Junior College in 1946. In 1948 he earned a Bachelor of Arts degree from Alabama State University. 

Howze converted to Catholicism in 1948, taking the name baptismal name of Joseph. He later entered the seminary for the Josephites, studying at Epiphany Apostolic College in upstate New York. He then taught science in the public school system and was later hired to teach at St. Monica School in Tulsa, Oklahoma, in 1952.

Catholic priesthood
After expressing a renewed interest in the priesthood, Howze was accepted to study for the priesthood at Christ the King Seminary at St. Bonaventure University in New York (receiving his Doctor of Divinity in 1959), and was ordained for the Diocese of Raleigh on May 7, 1959. He then served as a pastor in Asheville.

On November 8, 1972, Howze was appointed Auxiliary Bishop of Natchez-Jackson, Mississippi, and Titular Bishop of Maxita by Pope Paul VI. He was consecrated to the episcopate on January 28, 1973, by Archbishop Luigi Raimondi, the Apostolic Delegate to the United States, with Bishops Harold Robert Perry, S.V.D., and Joseph Bernard Brunini serving as co-consecrators.

When the Diocese of Biloxi was created in 1977, Howze was appointed its first bishop. He was the first openly Black bishop to head a diocese in the United States.

He retired June 6, 2001, and died January 9, 2019, in Ocean Springs, Mississippi, at the age of 95.

See also
 

 Catholic Church hierarchy
 Catholic Church in the United States
 Historical list of the Catholic bishops of the United States
 List of Catholic bishops of the United States
 Lists of patriarchs, archbishops, and bishops

References

External links
 Roman Catholic Diocese of Biloxi Official Site
 Oral history with Most Reverend Joseph Lawson E. Howze, University of Southern Mississippi. Center for Oral History and Cultural Heritage.
 National Black Catholic Clergy Caucus bio of Joseph Lawson Howze

Episcopal succession

1923 births
2019 deaths
20th-century Roman Catholic bishops in the United States
African-American Roman Catholic bishops
Catholics from Alabama
Converts to Roman Catholicism
People from Daphne, Alabama
Roman Catholic bishops in Mississippi
Roman Catholic Diocese of Biloxi
20th-century African-American people
21st-century African-American people
Epiphany Apostolic College